Beyler Tapdiq oglu Agayev  (3 February 1969, Qarağac, Qubadli, Azerbaijan SSR – 6 August 1992, Lachin, Azerbaijan) was the National Hero of Azerbaijan and warrior during the First Nagorno-Karabakh War.

Early life and education 
Agayev was born on 3 February 1969 in Qarağac village of Qubadli raion of Azerbaijan SSR. After completing his military service in the German Democratic Republic, he returned to Azerbaijan. In 1990, he entered Azerbaijan State Institute of Civil Engineers. When Armenians attacked the territories of Azerbaijan, he left his education unfinished and voluntarily joined Azerbaijani Armed Forces.

Agayev was single.

First Nagorno-Karabakh War 
Aghayev's high ability attracted attention and was appointed the commander of one of the divisions. He participated in battles for the villages of Səfiyan, Yuxarı Fərəcan and Aşağı Fərəcan, Mazutlu, Türklər və Suarası. 

On August 6, 1992, Agayev was shot dead while taking part in the battles for Lachin District of Azerbaijan.

Honors 
Beyler Tapdiq oglu Agayev was posthumously awarded the title of the "National Hero of Azerbaijan" under Presidential Decree No. 350 dated 7 December 1992. Aliyev was buried at a cemetery in Qarağac village.

A secondary school in Qarağac village of Qubadli raion was named after him.

See also 
 First Nagorno-Karabakh War
 List of National Heroes of Azerbaijan

References

Further reading 
Vüqar Əsgərov. Azərbaycanın Milli Qəhrəmanları (kitab)|"Azərbaycanın Milli Qəhrəmanları" (Yenidən işlənmiş II nəşr). Bakı: "Dərələyəz-M", 2010, səh. 86–87.

1969 births
1992 deaths
Azerbaijani military personnel
Azerbaijani military personnel of the Nagorno-Karabakh War
Azerbaijani military personnel killed in action
National Heroes of Azerbaijan
People from Qubadli District